William Frederick Todd (May 2, 1854 – March 16, 1935) was a businessman and political figure in New Brunswick. He represented Charlotte County in the Legislative Assembly of New Brunswick from 1899 to 1903 and Charlotte in the House of Commons of Canada from 1908 to 1911 as a Liberal member. Todd served as the 16th Lieutenant Governor of New Brunswick from February 28, 1923, to December 27, 1928.

He was born in St. Stephen, New Brunswick, the youngest son of Freeman H. Todd and Adeline Boardman. His father was a very successful lumber merchant and president of the St. Croix Soap Manufacturing Company. In 1879, William Todd married Ethel J. Bolton, the daughter of John Bolton. Todd was unsuccessful in bids for reelection in 1911, 1917, and 1921.

He died of a heart attack in 1935, while visiting a lawyer's office. He was the age of 80.

Electoral history

References 

Town of St. Stephen, New Brunswick website with indformation on the Todd mansion

 Canadian Parliamentary Guide, 1910, EJ Chambers

1854 births
1935 deaths
Businesspeople from New Brunswick
Liberal Party of Canada MPs
Lieutenant Governors of New Brunswick
Members of the House of Commons of Canada from New Brunswick
New Brunswick Liberal Association MLAs
People from St. Stephen, New Brunswick